Duke Nukem is a fictional character and protagonist of the Duke Nukem series of video games. The character first appeared in the 1991 video game Duke Nukem, developed by Apogee Software. He has since appeared in multiple sequels developed by 3D Realms. Most recently, he starred in Duke Nukem Forever, released by Gearbox Software, which now owns the rights and intellectual property.

The character was created by Todd Replogle, George Broussard, and Scott Miller of Apogee Software. Duke Nukem was redesigned as the present tough guy incarnation by George Broussard and Allen Blum for the 1996 game Duke Nukem 3D. A sequel to Duke Nukem 3D, Duke Nukem Forever, was released in 2011, after remaining in development since 1997.

Personality and appearance
In the original game, Duke Nukem barely spoke and was portrayed as a disgruntled TV viewer hired by the CIA to save Earth from the mad scientist Dr. Proton, whom he took offense to for interrupting his soap opera. In the second game, he began to evolve into a more traditional action hero, but remained mostly silent. Since the third game, Duke's personality has been that of a confident, aggressive, politically incorrect, wise-cracking, hyper-masculine man. Although not superhuman, Duke manages to achieve incredible physical feats of violence and conquest through sheer machismo and expertise with automatic firearms. In Duke Nukem Forever, his massive ego is somehow capable of functioning like a shield from physical damage.

His missions generally involve killing aliens that have invaded Earth. He is apparently sexually adept and irresistible to females, and circumstances often find him surrounded by many buxom women. However, he frequently mentions an estranged love interest named "Lani", and she becomes the basis for many of his jokes. This is widely believed to be a reference to Lani Minella, a voice actress who did several voices for Duke Nukem 3D.

Duke Nukem's current character is a pastiche of a number of Hollywood action heroes, including Dirty Harry, Arnold Schwarzenegger, and John Wayne. Many of his lines are taken from the movie Army of Darkness, and his most famous line is from the movie They Live with Roddy Piper saying, "It's time to kick ass and chew bubble gum. And I'm all out of gum." Duke's appearance resembles that of The Boz as well as characters played by Arnold Schwarzenegger, Dolph Lundgren and Jean-Claude Van Damme. Voiced by Jon St. John since the third game, Duke's voice is based on that of Clint Eastwood as Dirty Harry.

Duke is best known for his trademark jet pack, his golden IMI Desert Eagle pistol or golden Colt M1911, and Ray-Ban Wayfarer sunglasses, which completely conceal his eyes and which he has been seen wearing even at night since Duke Nukem 3D. His other trademark is a blond military-style flattop haircut which has existed since the first game, and the radioactive trefoil symbol, which is found on his belt-buckle, the side of his signature pistol, and numerous other locations throughout the games.  He usually wears a red tank top (pink in the first game), military tactical harness, blue jeans and black army boots — in some of the games, Duke executes a maneuver known as the "Mighty Boot," which is simply a strong front kick. He is also notable for constantly smoking a cigar.

In Duke Nukem II, Duke wrote an autobiography titled Why I'm So Great which he later autographed in Duke Nukem Forever. In Duke Nukem Forever, he's achieved immense fame and fortune since saving the Earth, now owning a casino on the Las Vegas Strip called The Ladykiller, in which the Damn! ... It's Late Show (hosted by Johnny O'Lenoman) is taped, and the Museum of Duke is housed, as well as a burger restaurant chain called Duke Burger. He is also linked to the EDF (Earth Defense Forces), answering to General Graves. In a news conference held at the end of Duke Nukem Forever, he announces his intention of running for president, which would make him the 69th U.S. president.

According to the stats provided by the Duke Nukem Character Memory Card, he is 6'4" (1,93 m) and at a body fat percentage of 8%, weighs 240 lbs. (109 kg).

Appearances
Duke Nukem was initially created in 1987 by chief programmer Todd Replogle of Apogee Software (now 3D Realms) as the protagonist for the video game he was designing titled Metal Future, which was set in the then-near future of "one decade later from now" in 1997. After hearing the character's name, producer and founder of Apogee, Scott Miller, suggested the game should have the same name, and he helped design the character. Artwork was produced by George Broussard, Allen H. Blum III, and Jim Norwood. Duke was not voiced, but spoke through on-screen text.

In the sequel, Duke Nukem II, which was released two years later, the same mostly-silent incarnation of the character was used, although he was now an American hero. Duke Nukem II features an intro with one line, spoken by Joe Siegler ("I'm back"), and a death scream by character co-creator Todd Replogle.

For Duke Nukem 3D, the character of Duke Nukem was dramatically redesigned by George Broussard and Allen Blum as the more familiar macho, wise-cracking character of today. Duke Nukem 3D was one of the most controversial games at the time due to its strong violence, cultural stereotypes, strong language, and sexual content. Duke Nukem 3D, as well as the dozen or so subsequent Duke Nukem games, feature Jon St. John as the voice of Duke Nukem. Duke Nukem 3D was the first game in which the character has a significant speaking role.

In March 2018, it was announced that John Cena will star in a Duke Nukem movie for Paramount Pictures & Platinum Dunes. However, in January 2019, Duke Nukem voice actor Jon St. John stated that no movie was in development. In a press statement announcing Embracer Group's acquisition of Gearbox Software, however, production of the film was reconfirmed.

Games with Duke Nukem as a protagonist
 Duke Nukem (temporarily "Duke Nukum") – 1991 – MS-DOS
 Duke Nukem II – 1993 – MS-DOS, iPhone/iPod Touch, iPad
 Duke Nukem 3D – 1996 – MS-DOS, Mac OS, Sega Saturn, Mega Drive, Game.com, Xbox Live Arcade, iPhone/iPod Touch, Nokia N900, Source ports, Android, iPad
 Duke Nukem 64 – 1997 – Nintendo 64
 Duke Nukem: Total Meltdown – 1997 – PlayStation
 Duke Nukem: Time to Kill – 1998 – PlayStation
 Duke Nukem: Zero Hour – 1998 – Nintendo 64
 Duke Nukem – 1999 – Game Boy Color
 Duke Nukem: Land of the Babes (temporarily "Planet of the Babes") – 2000 – PlayStation
 Duke Nukem: Manhattan Project – 2002 – Microsoft Windows, Xbox Live Arcade
 Duke Nukem Advance – 2002 – Game Boy Advance
 Duke Nukem Mobile – 2004 – Tapwave Zodiac
 Duke Nukem Mobile - 2004 - Cellular phones
 Duke Nukem Mobile II: Bikini Project – 2005 – Cellular phones
 Duke Nukem Mobile 3D – 2005 – Cellular phones (updated port of the original Zodiac version with enhanced graphics)
 Duke Nukem Arena - 2007 - Cellular phones (updated port of Duke Nukem Mobile 3D that included an arena-style multiplayer)
 Duke Nukem: Critical Mass – 2011 - Nintendo DS
 Duke Nukem Forever – 2011 – Microsoft Windows, Mac OS X, Xbox 360, PlayStation 3
 Duke Nukem 3D: World Tour – 2016 – Microsoft Windows, Xbox One, PlayStation 4, Nintendo Switch

Other appearances
 Cosmo's Cosmic Adventure - 1992 - MS-DOS
 Death Rally - 1996 - MS-DOS
 Balls of Steel - 1997 - Microsoft Windows
 Blood - 1997 - MS-DOS
 Serious Sam 2 - 2005 - Microsoft Windows, Linux, Xbox
 Death Rally - 2011 - Microsoft Windows, iOS
 Choplifter HD - 2012 - Microsoft Windows, PlayStation 3, Xbox 360
 Bulletstorm: Full Clip Edition - 2017 - Microsoft Windows, PlayStation 4, Xbox One
 Rad Rodgers: Radical Edition - 2018 - Microsoft Windows, PlayStation 4, Xbox One, Nintendo Switch
 Wild Buster: Heroes of Titan - 2018 - Microsoft Windows
 Ready Player One - 2018 - Film
 Duke Nukem - TBA - Film

Reception
Duke Nukem has been listed on many "Best Characters" and "Best Heroes" lists over the years, including being listed as number one in ScrewAttack's "Top 10 Coolest Video Game Characters" list in 2007. Featuring him in the section "top ten forces of good" in their 2004 list of top 50 retro game heroes, Retro Gamer called Duke "the ultimate cheese hero, and a true remnant of 80’s action flicks." He was listed at number 27 in the "Top 50 Video Game Characters" list by Guinness World Records Gamer's Edition 2011. GameDaily also ranked him sixth on their list of best anti-heroes in video games. In 2011, Empire ranked him as the 20th greatest video game character, calling him "one of the best action characters ever devised" and adding that "Film might have Schwarzenegger, but Gaming's got Mr Nukem".

Reception of the character by the time of Duke Nukem Forever's release was mostly mixed. Dan Whitehead of Eurogamer elaborated on Duke Nukem's decreased relevance since 1996, and added that the character's "half-hearted digs" at rival franchises were ill-advised due to the game's datedness. Charles Onyett of IGN likened Duke Nukem's maturity to a "12-year-old boy with Internet access" and expressed disappointment in the character's datedness and the missed opportunity on the developers' part to "[play] with the idea of Duke as an anachronism". Ryan Winterhalter of 1UP.com noted that Duke Nukem had become "a caricature of his former self. He's crossed the line from charmingly foul-mouthed to obnoxious and embarrassing." Cian Hassett of PALGN was more positive about the character, finding him to be "genuinely hilarious" due to his tongue-in-cheek rejection of video game traditions (such as finding a key to open a door or wearing a special suit of armor).

Notes

References

Action-adventure game characters
Duke Nukem
Fictional alcohol abusers
Fictional American people in video games
Fictional cannabis users
Fictional characters from California
Fictional gamblers
Fictional gunfighters in video games
Fictional super soldiers
Fictional mercenaries in video games
First-person shooter characters
Male characters in video games
Video game characters introduced in 1991
Video game characters with accelerated healing
Video game mascots
Video game protagonists